The Boles Fire was a wildfire that burned in Siskiyou County during mid-September 2014. On September 15, at 1:38 p.m. PDT, the Boles Fire ignited near Weed, California. Later on the same day, at 10:30 p.m. PDT, the Boles Fire was reported at 350 acres and 15% containment. Over 100 structures were reported damaged or destroyed on that day. Later that day, the wildfire was reported at nearly 100% containment; however, this report turned out to be erroneous. On September 16, the Boles Fire had burned 375 acres (152 ha) and was only 20% contained. It also destroyed 150 residences and forced the evacuation of 1,500 people in Weed and Siskiyou County. 

The wildfire also caused 1 injury. The Boles Fire destroyed a total of 150 residential structures and 8 nonresidential commercial properties, while damaging 4 single residences and 3 nonresidential commercial properties. , the damage caused by the Boles Fire is unknown. 

The cause of the wildfire was reported as "under investigation" in 2015. As of December 5, 2014, Ronald Beau Marshall was subject to a preliminary hearing after being charged with arson in the Boles Fire case. In 2015, he was sentenced to three years in prison for recklessly starting the fire; he was released from prison in 2016.

References 

2014 California wildfires
Wildfires in Siskiyou County, California